Dian Irawan (born November 14, 1984) is an Indonesian footballer who currently plays for Mitra Kukar in Indonesia Soccer Championship A.

Club career 
In December 2014, he signed with Gresik United.

Honours

Club 
Persibo Bojonegoro
Winner
 Piala Indonesia: 2012

Individual 
 Piala Indonesia Best Player: 2012

References

External links 
 

1984 births
Living people
People from Bogor
Association football midfielders
Indonesian footballers
Indonesian Premier League players
Liga 1 (Indonesia) players
Persibo Bojonegoro players
Persisam Putra Samarinda players
Gresik United players
Sportspeople from West Java